Shanghai is a computerized version of mahjong solitaire published by Activision in 1986 for the Amiga, Atari ST, Atari 8-bit family, Commodore 64, DOS, Macintosh, Apple IIGS and Master System. Shanghai was originally programmed by Brodie Lockard. It was released as an arcade game by Sunsoft in 1988.

Gameplay 
The game uses a full set of 144 mahjong tiles, divided as follows:

 Dots (1 through 9)
 Bamboos (1 through 9)
 Characters (1 through 9)
 Winds (north, east, south, west)
 Dragons (red, green, white)
 Seasons (spring, summer, autumn, winter)
 Flowers (bamboo, plum, orchid, chrysanthemum)

There are four of every tile except for the seasons and flowers, which have only one tile each.

The object of the game is to remove all the tiles from the board by matching pairs. However, only tiles with at least one free vertical edge may be matched on a turn. Any two seasons can form a pair, as can any two flowers. The game ends if no legal moves can be made.

After winning a game, a portion of the screen collapses to reveal a dragon blinking an eye. The Macintosh and Master System versions show an animated dragon spitting fire.

Reception

Shanghai sold more than 500,000 copies by 1991. In Japan, Game Machine listed Sunsoft's version of Shanghai on their May 1, 1988, issue as being the fourth most-successful table arcade unit of the month; it ended the year as Japan's ninth highest-grossing arcade conversion kit of 1988.

In 1996, Computer Gaming World declared Shanghai the 146th-best computer game ever released.

Reviews
Computer Gaming World in December 1986 published varying opinions. Gregg Williams stated, "I couldn't believe [Activision] had wasted their resources on putting it out", while Charles Ardai called it "probably the best game of the year". Roy Wagner reviewed the game for Computer Gaming World, and stated that "On the C64, the patterns and stacks are hard to discern (soon your eyes match the screen). On the Amiga the display is outstanding with the pieces actually looking very much like colorful, ivory tiles." Info gave the Amiga version four-plus stars out of five, stating "This program ought to be illegal. It is impossible to play 'just one game'". Describing gameplay as "swift and deceptively simple", the magazine warned "Plan on spending a LOT of time with this one". It gave the Commodore 64 version three-plus stars out of five, describing Shanghai as "fanatically addictive". While criticizing the user interface and graphics, the magazine concluded that "you'll find it hard to quit". Compute! reviewed the game favorably, reporting that "our Shanghai mania is of such proportions that I am beginning to fear for our health". In 1988, Dragon gave the game 5 out of 5 stars.

Atari Lynx
Dragon magazine gave the Atari Lynx version 5 stars in their May 1992 issue. Robert Jung of IGN gave the game a score of 10 out of 10 in his review. Computer and Video Games magazine reviewed the game in their March 1991 issue giving an 84% score.

Legacy

A sequel, Shanghai II, was released by Sun Electronics (Sunsoft) for Japanese arcades in March 1989. It was Japan's twelfth highest-grossing arcade conversion kit of 1992.

Shanghai II: Dragon's Eye was published in 1990 for MS-DOS. Ports were released for Macintosh, Apple IIGS, FM Towns, MSX, PC-98, Sharp X68000, Windows, Sega Genesis, and Super NES. The Genesis version was re-released on the Wii Virtual Console in the PAL regions on November 27, 2009, and in North America on January 11, 2010, which was later delisted at the end of 2013.

Other sequels include:

Shanghai III – Released by Sunsoft for arcades in 1993. In Japan, it was the fifth highest-grossing arcade printed circuit board (PCB) software in 1994, and sixth in 1995.
Shanghai: Triple-Threat
Shanghai: Great Moments
Shanghai: True Valor

References

External links
Shanghai for the Atari ST at Atari Mania
Shanghai at MobyGames
Review in Compute!
Review in Antic
Review in The Rainbow
Review in Page 6

1986 video games
Activision games
Amiga games
Apple II games
Apple IIGS games
Amstrad CPC games
Atari 8-bit family games
Atari Lynx games
Classic Mac OS games
Commodore 64 games
DOS games
FM Towns games
Game Boy games
Hamster Corporation games
Master System games
MSX games
NEC PC-8801 games
NEC PC-9801 games
Nintendo Entertainment System games
Nintendo Switch games
PlayStation 4 games
Sharp X1 games
TRS-80 Color Computer games
TurboGrafx-16 games
Video games developed in the United States
Video games scored by Alex Rudis
Video games scored by Naoki Kodaka
Video games scored by Russell Lieblich
Virtual Console games
X68000 games